Laura Charlotte Bear  (born 1965) is a British anthropologist and academic, specialising in economic anthropology of South Asia and the United Kingdom. She is Professor of Anthropology at the London School of Economics and head of its Department of Anthropology.

Bear's research has focused on India and the United Kingdom. While her early research concerned the effect of austerity on communities in India, she has most recently been studying the effect of the COVID-19 pandemic on vulnerable households in the United Kingdom. She is a member of three sub-groups of the British government's Scientific Advisory Group for Emergencies (SAGE).

In 2021, Bear was elected a Fellow of the British Academy (FBA), the United Kingdom's national academy for the humanities and social sciences.

Bear was appointed Member of the Order of the British Empire (MBE) in the 2022 New Year Honours for services to anthropology during Covid-19.

Selected works

References

Living people
British anthropologists
Economic anthropologists
Women anthropologists
Academics of the London School of Economics
Fellows of the British Academy
1965 births
Members of the Order of the British Empire